Highway 49 and Provincial Trunk Highway 49 (PTH 49) is a highway in the east central portion of the Canadian province of Saskatchewan and a very short highway in province of Manitoba. It runs from Saskatchewan Highway 35 between the communities of Fosston and Hendon to the Saskatchewan – Manitoba border, before ending at Provincial Trunk Highway 83 south of the community of Benito.

Route description
From Highway 35, it travels east to the Manitoba border, where it transitions to PTH 49. This is a primary Saskatchewan highway maintained by the provincial government and is paved for its length. Located along this highway are Kelvington, Lintlaw, Preeceville, Sturgis, Norquay, Pelly, and Arran. This highway also runs near Stenen and Hyas.

Highway 49 arrives at Fort Livingstone, the first capital for the entire North-West Territories from 1874-76. For , this highway features several various festivals, and attractions as the road passes through vibrant towns and villages.

Saskatchewan

Major attractions
Highway 49 hosts the following lakes, beaches, historical sites and buildings, and provincial parks.
 The original Kelvington Canadian National Railway CN station, was constructed in 1922, has been declared a heritage property.
Kelvington 9-hole Golf Course is located just to the south of the Town of Kelvington.
 Hockey Cards billboard is a Canadian roadside attraction near Kelvington, Canada’s hockey Factory
Timberline Outfitting near Norquay, SK and Riel Bosse Outfitting and Guiding near Kelvington, Sk are available for hunting trips.
Norquay Campground is located near the town centre of Norquay
Crystal Lake is just south of the Highway 9 South and Highway 49 junction near Stenen
 Crystal Lake 9 holes Municipal Golf Course, looked after by Stenen, Saskatchewan.
Lac La course is just south of the Highway 8 South and Highway 49 junction near Pelly
Just north of Highway 49 by 8 miles is the Sturgis & District Regional Park located on Lady Lake. This park provides fishing, camping, and swimming activities.
Ketchen Lake Bible Camp is located just to the north of Highway 49 between Ketchen, and Preeceville.
Preeceville Museum features both Ukrainian and Scandinavian ethnic history along with local pioneer history.
Preeceville Picnic Area is located just east of Preeceville, a nice stop on a long highway journey for a rest.
Preeceville Wildlife Association Campground is located just north of the town of Preeceville with hiking trails to Annie Laurie Lake and a new beach there.
Preeceville hosts a plethora of events.
Western Days features Gymkana, Chariots, Chuck Wagons, Country Dance, as well as Slow-pitch and fastball tournaments
Mushers Rendezvous features sled dog races
Lions Trade Show showcasing economic highlights.
Rockin @ The River outdoor concert.
Preeceville Pats Hockey Team.
Sturgis hosts Saskatchewan's Largest One Day Sports & Rodeo
 Bucking Horse and Rider statue is a large Canadian roadside attraction is located in Rodeo Falls Park along Highway 49.
Sturgis Ski Hill on the north of town provides a ski lift as well as ski chalet.
Assiniboine River runs through Sturgis.
The Sturgis Museum is located in the old CNR Station which has been relocated on the Assiniboine River Valley a block south of Highway 9/49. This museum features pioneer artifacts as well as local arrowheads.
 Fort Pelly-Livingstone Museum features the local areas vibrant Royal North-West Mounted Police history. The original fort was entitled Fort Livingstone or (Swan River Barracks) located on the forks of Swan River and Snake Creek and is designated as a heritage site.
The Snake pits featuring Garter Snakes are located just north of Pelly, Saskatchewan.
Fort Pelly Livingstone museum located in the Village of Pelly

History
Ketchen, Preeceville, Sturgis, and Norquay all host early Norwegian ethnic bloc settling in the early 20th century.
1899 saw the arrival of Doukhobor settlers near the area of Pelly, Saskatchewan
In 1876, David Laird, the first Lieutenant-Governor of the North-West Territories held the First Session of the North-West Territorial Council at Fort Livingstone near Pelly, Saskatchewan. The Dominion Government designated this area as the First Seat of Government for the entire territories in 1875. The capital of the North-West Territories and Royal North West Mounted Police Barracks soon moved to Battleford.
Hyas to Stenen on Highway 49 was part of a repaving project in the fall of 1999

Manitoba
Provincial Trunk Highway 49 (PTH 49) is a very short provincial highway in the Canadian province of Manitoba.

Along with PTH 27 and 57, PTH 49 is one of the shortest provincial trunk highways within Manitoba.

The speed limit is 90 km/h (55 mph).

History
Prior to 1947, PTH 49 was part of Highway 6 which extended via Benito to Swan River, Dauphin, and Minnedosa. The section from the highway's current eastern terminus to Roblin was opened to traffic in 1948 and designated as Highway 31 along with the remaining section of highway to Swan River. This route was redesignated as PTH 83 in 1954. 

The current route between the Saskatchewan border and Highway 31 was redesignated to PTH 49 in 1947.

Major intersections
From west to east:

Footnotes

References

External links

 Manitoba 511 - Road and Traveller Information
 Highway Hotline: Saskatchewan Highway Conditions
 Big Things of Canada, A Celebration of Community Monuments of Canada

049